Special National Assembly elections were held in the Philippines on 10 December 1940 for the four vacant seats in the National Assembly of the Philippines — namely the third district of Albay, the second district of Iloilo, the fifth district of Leyte and the second district of Nueva Ecija. The date of the special elections was fixed by President Manuel Quezon on 4 October 1940 by virtue of Proclamation No. 625.

The special elections were held on the same date as local elections for provincial, municipal and city officials.

Results

|-
!colspan=2 style="background-color:#E9E9E9;text-align:left;" |Parties and coalitions
! style="background-color:#E9E9E9;text-align:right;" |%
! style="background-color:#E9E9E9;text-align:right;" |Seats
|-
| style="text-align:left;" colspan=2 |Nacionalista Party (Coalicion Nacionalista)
| style="text-align:right;" |100.0
| style="text-align:right;" |4
|-
| style="text-align:left;" colspan=2 |Young Philippines 
| style="text-align:right;" |0.0
| style="text-align:right;" |0
|-
| style="text-align:left;" colspan=2 |Popular Philippines
| style="text-align:right;" |0.0
| style="text-align:right;" |0
|-
| style="text-align:left;" colspan=2 |Popular Front (Juan Sumulong Wing)
| style="text-align:right;" |0.0
| style="text-align:right;" |0
|-
| style="text-align:left;" colspan=2 |Popular Front (Pedro Abad Santos Wing)
| style="text-align:right;" |0.0
| style="text-align:right;" |0
|-
|colspan=2 style="text-align:left;background-color:#E9E9E9"|Total
|width="75" style="text-align:right;background-color:#E9E9E9"|100.00
|width="30" style="text-align:right;background-color:#E9E9E9"|4
|-
| style="text-align:left;" colspan=5 |Source: Philippine Legislature: 100 Years by Cesar Pobre.
|}
The following were elected to fill the four vacant seats in the National Assembly of the Philippines:
Albay—3rd: Marcial O. Rañola
Iloilo—2nd: Oscar Ledesma
Leyte—5th: Atilano R. Cinco
Nueva Ecija—2nd: Gabriel Belmonte

External links
Official website of the Commission on Elections

References

Special elections to the Congress of the Philippines
Special election
Elections in Albay
Elections in Leyte (province)
Politics of Iloilo
Politics of Nueva Ecija